Ithobaal III (Latin Ithobalus, Hebrew Ethbaal) was recorded by Josephus as the king on the list of kings of Tyre reigning 591/0–573/2 BCE at the time of the first fall of Jerusalem, and therefore the subject of Ezekiel's cherub in Eden. During his time, Josephus also wrote that Nebuchadnezzar II besieged Tyre for 13 years, which probably covered 585 to 573 BC. The precise year it began is difficult to pinpoint with scholars divided as to whether it started in 598, the seventh year of Nebuchadnezzar's reign, or 585, which was Ithobaal III's seventh year as king. There are even those who proposed an earlier date - around 603-590 - citing that the Babylonians would have attacked it first before launching a campaign against Egypt. The city, according to the oracles of Ezekiel was not captured. Ithobaal himself survived the siege with the prophet acknowledging that "King Nebuchadnezzar of Babylon made his army labor hard against Tyre... yet neither he nor his army got anything".

References

Monarchs of the Hebrew Bible
Kings of Tyre
6th-century BC biblical rulers
People from Tyre, Lebanon
6th-century BC Phoenician people